The Swiss National Road Race Championships are held annually. They are a cycling race which decides the Swiss cycling champion in the road racing discipline, across several categories of rider. The event was first held in 1892 and was won by Edouard Wicky. Ferdinand Kübler and Heiri Suter share the men's record with 5 victories. The current champions are Caroline Baur for women and Robin Froidevaux for men.

Multiple winners

Men

Men

Elite

U23

Women

Notes

References

External links 
the Cycling WebSite

National road cycling championships
Cycle races in Switzerland
Recurring events established in 1892
Road race